The Wrath of Grapes may refer to:
The Wrath of Grapes, the British title for Leonard Wibberley's novel The Mouse That Roared
The Wrath of Grapes: The Don Cherry Story II, a TV miniseries